William Lewis Nolte (1889–1965) was a screenwriter and film director in the United States. He directed the musical film The Duke Is Tops released by Million Dollar Productions. It was re-released in 1943 under the title The Bronze Venus. He is credited as a  production manager for the 1942 film Thunder River Feud and as a line producer on the 1947 film Shadow Valley. From 1949 until at least 1957 he was an assistant director on several films.

He was co-writer for the 1951 television show Buckskin Rangers.

Selected filmography
Romance Revier (1934), assistant director
West on Parade (1934), assistant director
 Gun Play (1935) 
Wolf Riders (1935), assistant director
The Duke Is Tops (1938), director
Life Goes On (1938), director. Reissued in 1944 as His Harlem Wife
Take My Life (1942), production manager
Saddle Mountain Roundup (1941), original story
Square Dance Jubilee (1949), author

References

American film directors
1889 births
1965 deaths